"Everybody Loves Somebody" is a song written in 1947 by Irving Taylor and pianist Ken Lane, and made famous by Dean Martin who recorded and released his version in 1964.

History
Although written almost 20 years earlier, by 1964 the song had already been recorded by several artists—including Frank Sinatra—but without much success. Lane was playing piano for Dean Martin on his Dream with Dean LP sessions, and with an hour or so of studio time left and one song short, Lane suggested that Martin take a run at his tune. Dean was agreeable, and the small combo of piano, guitar, drums, and bass performed a relatively quiet, laid-back version of the song (coincidentally, Martin had sung it almost 20 years earlier on Bob Hope's radio show in 1948, and also on Martin and Lewis's NBC radio program at about the same time). Almost immediately Martin re-recorded the song for his next album, this time with a full orchestra and chorus. His label, Reprise Records, was so enthusiastic about the hit potential of this version they titled the LP Everybody Loves Somebody to capitalize on it.

Although still a major recording artist, Dean Martin had not had a top 40 hit since 1958. With the British Invasion ruling the U.S. charts, few had hopes that an Italian crooner who had been singing mainly standards for almost 20 years would sway many teenagers. Martin resented rock n' roll, and his attitude created conflict at home with his 12-year-old son Dean Paul Martin, who like many young people at the time worshipped pop groups like The Beatles. He told his son, "I'm gonna knock your pallies off the charts," and on August 15, 1964 he did just that: "Everybody Loves Somebody" knocked The Beatles' "A Hard Day's Night" off the No. 1 slot on Billboard, going straight up to the top of both the Billboard Hot 100 and the Pop-Standard Singles chart, the latter for eight weeks.

It ultimately replaced "That's Amore" as Martin's signature song, and he sang it as the theme of his weekly television variety show from 1965 to 1974. The song has become so identified with Martin that later versions are invariably compared to his take.

"Everybody Loves Somebody Sometime" appears on Martin's grave marker in Los Angeles.

Covers
Ray Gelato recorded a cover of the song inserted in the 2004 self-titled album (T2, TWR0131-2), released in the UK.

Chart performance
Frank Sinatra

Dean Martin

References
Notes

Bibliography
The Billboard Book of Top 40 Hits, 6th Edition, 1996

External links
 
 

1947 songs
1964 singles
Andy Williams songs
Billboard Hot 100 number-one singles
Cashbox number-one singles
Dean Martin songs
Frank Sinatra songs
Grammy Hall of Fame Award recipients
Guy Mitchell songs
Number-one singles in New Zealand
Pop ballads
Reprise Records singles
Song recordings produced by Jimmy Bowen
Songs written by Irving Taylor (songwriter)
Songs written by Sam Coslow